() is a Japanese model, gravure idol, and actress born on 1982-04-03 in Higashiōsaka, Osaka and raised in Tokyo, Japan. She graduated from the private Horikoshi High School, the same school attended by talent such as Yoko Minamino, Yōko Oginome, Ai Katō, and Masumi Miyazaki.

History
In 1993, Nakane joined the Nezumikko Club, an all-girl idol group composed of Nakane, Natsu Itō, Kana Itō, Sato Higashi, Ami Yamazaki, Emiko Inoue, Juri Miyazawa, and Chiaki Nakajima. The group was created to ride on the popularity of such groups as Onyanko Club. The group released two albums, both in 1993. In 1996, she began working as a gravure idol, gaining success due to having a larger bust for her age. Nakane began appearing in 1999 in drama series, as well as in variety, sports, educational, and other television programs.

She married Japanese baseball player Tsuyoshi Wada on 2005-12-10. She gave birth to their first daughter on September 13, 2006.

Nakane has been a spokesperson for MSN at the WPB Expo in Tokyo. She helped launch a "morning wake-up call" service in 2002 by personally calling five customers selected at random as part of the service. In 2004, she participated in a Yahoo! chat session to promote the release of  her DVD box set Nakane Kasumi Memories Box "Merci!" in which over 6700 individuals participated by submitting over 3700 questions. She is represented by the talent management firm Big Apple.

Media

Filmography
Gun Crazy 3: The Big Gundown (2003)

DVD and video releases
 (January 2001, Shueisha)
S’il vous plait (April 2003, Takeshobo)
 (2004-07-16, Shueisha)
 (November 2005, Takeshobo)

Photo books
 (September 1999, Home-sha)
 (September  2000, Home-sha)
 (April 2001, Kodansha)
 (August 2001, DigiCube)
 (December 2001, Shueisha)
 (September 2002, DigiCube)
 (September 2002, Shogakukan, Young Sunday Special Graphic Vol.2)
 (November 2002, Home-sha, includes a DVD)
 (November 2002, Takeshobo)
 (2003-04-26, Pioneer LDC)
S’il vous plait (April 2003, Takeshobo)
 (2003-07-04, Takeshobo)
 (August 2003, DigiCube)
 (November 2003, Kodansha)
 (January 2004, Shogakukan)
 (2004-04-02, Shueisha)
Unplugged (2004-12-01, Gakken)
Shizuku (2005-12-19)
 (2005-12-22, Kodansha)
Style (2006-01-25, Traidia)

Other books
 (February 2006, Futabasha)

Media sources:

References

External links
 Kasumi Nakane official profile

Japanese gravure idols
Japanese television personalities
Living people
1982 births
People from Higashiōsaka
Horikoshi High School alumni